Lalah Hathaway is the 1990 debut album of singer Lalah Hathaway. The album's first single was "Heaven Knows", produced by Derek Bramble. The follow-up single was "Baby Don't Cry", produced by Angela Winbush. The third single was "Somethin'". Virgin also released Night and Day, an EP available only in Japan. The disc featured two versions of the song "Night and Day" as well as two songs taken from the Lalah Hathaway album. Promotional music videos were shot for the singles "Heaven Knows", "Baby Don't Cry", and "Somethin'".

Track listing
 "Somethin'" (David Foster, Brenda Russell) — 3:38 
 "Heaven Knows" (Derek Bramble) — 5:17 
 "Baby Don't Cry" (Angela Winbush) — 4:04 
 "Smile" (Russell Ferrante, Marilyn Scott) — 4:55 
 "U-Godit Gowin On" (Craig T. Cooper, Deborah Cooper) — 3:28 
 "I'm Coming Back" (Gary Taylor) — 5:37 
 "Stay Home Tonight" (Martin Van Blockson) — 4:16 
 "I Gotta Move On" (Angela Winbush) — 4:46 
 "Sentimental" (Chuckii Booker) — 3:42 
 "Obvious" (Craig T, Cooper, Deborah Cooper, Denise Stewart) — 5:16

Singles & EPs

"Heaven Knows" 
Cassette Single:
 "Heaven Knows" (7" edit)
 "U-Godit Gowin On"

UK CD Single:
 7" Edit — 3:59
 12" Edit — 5:19
 Instrumental — 5:11

UK 12" Single: 
Side A:
 "Heaven Knows" (12" Version)
 "Heaven Knows" (7" Version)
Side B:
 "Heaven Knows" (Instrumental)
 "U-Godit Gowin On"

Promo CD:
 Yvonne Turner 12"
 Yvonne Turner 7"
 Yvonne Turner Instrumental

"Baby Don't Cry" 
Cassette Single:
 "Baby Don't Cry" (edit)
 "U-Godit Gowin On"

UK CD Single:
 Radio Version
 Crybaby Club Version

US 12" Vinyl:
Side A:
 "Baby Don't Cry" (Cry Baby Club Version) — 6:40
 "Baby Don't Cry" (Sleaze Version) — 7:40
 "Baby Don't Cry" (Radio Version) — 3:50
Side B:
 "Heaven Knows" (Yvonne Turner 7") — 4:35
 "Heaven Knows" (Yvonne Turner Instrumental) — 5:20
 "Heaven Knows" (Yvonne Turner 7") — 5:57

"I'm Coming Back"  

Promo 12":
Side A:
 "I'm Coming Back" (edit) — 3:50
 "I'm Coming Back" (lp version) — 5:35
Side B:
 "Smile" — 4:55

"It's Somethin'" 
Cassette Single:
 "Somethin'"
 "Stay Home Tonight"

Promo CD (PRCD 3803): 
 Radio Mix — 3:52
 Move Groove Mix — 3:55
 12" Mix — 5:15
 Smoove & Sassy Mix — 3:48

12" Single:
 Move Groove Mix
 Smoove & Sassy Mix
 Dub Mix

Night And Day 
Japanese EP:
 "Night And Day"
 "Somethin'"
 "Baby Don't Cry"
 "Night And Day" (a cappella version)
CATALOG NUMBER: VJCP-14022

Charts

Weekly charts

Year-end charts

References

External links
 

1990 debut albums
Lalah Hathaway albums
Albums produced by Angela Winbush
Albums produced by Chuckii Booker
Virgin Records albums